Durga Keshar Khanal is the 1st Provincial Governor of Karnali Province. He was recommended as Governor of Karnali Province on 13 January 2018.

Early life

See also
 Govinda Subba
 Ratneshwar Lal Kayastha
 Anuradha Koirala
 Baburam Kunwar
 Mohan Raj Malla

References

External links

Living people
1944 births
People from Surkhet District
Nepali Congress politicians from Karnali Province
Governors of Karnali Province
Members of the National Assembly (Nepal)